Lote Tuipulotu (born 22 November 1987) is an American professional rugby union player. He plays as a prop for the Utah Warriors in Major League Rugby.

Tupulotu was born in Tonga and educated at Liahona High School. He played for the Tonga national rugby league team from 2010 to 2014 and also for the Tonga A Rugby Union squad in 2015.

After moving to the United States in 2015 he was selected for the USA Islanders. In November 2017 he joined the Utah Warriors for the 2018 season.

References

1987 births
Living people
American rugby union players
Tongan rugby union players
Utah Warriors players
Rugby union hookers